Andorra has competed at the IAAF World Athletics Championships on thirteen occasions, all editions from the 1991 World Championships in Athletics onwards. Its competing country code is AND. The country has not won any medals at the competition and as of 2017 no Andorran athlete has reached the top eight of an event. Its best performance is by Antoni Bernadó, who placed 26th in the 2005 men's marathon.

2019
Andorra competed at the 2019 World Athletics Championships in Doha, Qatar, from 27 September to 6 October 2019. Andorra was be represented by 1 athlete.

References 

 
Andorra
World Championships in Athletics